Mehdi Oubila is a Moroccan professional footballer who plays as a midfielder for Hassania Agadir.

References

1992 births
Living people
Moroccan footballers
Association football midfielders
SCC Mohammédia players
Hassania Agadir players